Jon Kudelka (born 1972) is an Australian editorial cartoonist. His work has regularly appeared in The Australian, The Mercury and The Saturday Paper.

Kudelka was born in Burnie, Tasmania and obtained a Bachelor of Science from the University of Tasmania. In 2008, he won the Stanley Award for best editorial/political cartoonist, as well as the Walkley Award for best cartoon. In 2018 he won a second Walkley for a cartoon about Uluru, while in 2019 he won the Vince O’Farrell Award for Outstanding Cartoon at the Kennedy Awards.

References

External links
 

Living people
Walkley Award winners
Australian editorial cartoonists
1972 births
People from Burnie, Tasmania
University of Tasmania alumni